The Fête du Lac des Nations is an annual festival held in Sherbrooke, Quebec in the month of July. It takes place in Parc Jacques-Cartier and features locally, regionally, and globally known musicians, as well as theme park attractions and fireworks. It started in 1981 and in 2011 had a total of 213,000 visitors.

References

External links
 Official website

Summer festivals
Recurring events established in 1981
Festivals in Quebec
Culture of Sherbrooke
1981 establishments in Quebec